The 2013 Asian Judo Championships were the 20th edition of the Asian Judo Championships, and were held in Bangkok, Thailand from April 19 to April 21, 2013.

Medal summary

Men

Women

Medal table

Participating nations 
218 athletes from 28 nations competed.

 (1)
 (13)
 (14)
 (5)
 (12)
 (10)
 (7)
 (13)
 (13)
 (7)
 (11)
 (4)
 (4)
 (3)
 (14)
 (2)
 (7)
 (3)
 (9)
 (4)
 (1)
 (14)
 (3)
 (14)
 (8)
 (3)
 (14)
 (5)

References

External links
 www.ippon.org

Asian Championships
2013 in Thai sport
2013
International sports competitions hosted by Thailand
2013 in Bangkok
Sport in Bangkok
Jufo